Mashayekh (also Romanized as Mashāyekh; also known as Tangakī) is a village in Kamaraj Rural District, Kamaraj and Konartakhteh District, Kazerun County, Fars Province, Iran. At the 2006 census, its population was 334, in 58 families.

References 

Populated places in Kazerun County